Antti Roppo (February 9, 1989 – February 8, 2018) was a Finnish professional ice hockey forward who played for Ilves and HPK of the SM-liiga.

References

External links

1989 births
2018 deaths
HPK players
Ilves players
Finnish ice hockey forwards
Indiana Ice players
Ice hockey people from Tampere